Boundary is an Application Performance Management (APM) company based in San Francisco, California. Boundary’s APM solution, also called Boundary, is delivered in a software as a service (SaaS) model. Boundary’s APM software can monitor applications that are running in cloud, on-premises, or hybrid environments.  The software displays data as a real-time visual map so that IT managers can see changes to their systems. The application runs on Windows and Linux operating systems. Boundary was acquired by BMC Software in 2015.

History

Boundary was co-founded by Cliff Moon, previously an engineer for Powerset. In 2012, Scale Venture Partners and Lightspeed Venture Partners invested $15 million in the company. CEO Gary Read joined the company in 2012. In 2014 Moon acts as the company's CTO.

References 

Companies based in San Francisco
2010 establishments in California